The 12957 / 12958 Swarna Jayanti Rajdhani Express is a Rajdhani Express train on the Indian Railways broad-gauge track network, connecting Ahmedabad and New Delhi, a distance of approximately 933.5 km. The train was one of the last Rajdhani Express trains to be introduced in the 20th century, making its inaugural run in 1997 after the erstwhile metre-gauge lines between Ahmedabad and Delhi through Gujarat, Rajasthan and Haryana were converted to broad gauge. Since it was introduced in the 50th year of India's independence, it was named 'Swarna Jayanti' (golden jubilee) Rajdhani Express.

Schedule 
As of 1 March 2013, the Swarna Jayanti Rajdhani Express runs daily using the Jaipur–Ahmedabad line on Ahmedabad–Delhi main line.  12957 departs ADI at 18:00 and arrives at NDLS at 07:40 the next day. 12958 departs NDLS at 19:55 and arrives at ADI at 09:40 the next day, averaging approximately 70 km/hr on both runs. In this sector, it is the fastest train between Ahmedabad and New Delhi. During its journey, the train passes through the Indian states of Gujarat, Rajasthan, Haryana and Delhi. The entire route of the train is electrified and only the section between Jagudan and Palanpur Junction is on single line as of July 2022.

Time Table

Traction 
It is hauled by a Vadodara Loco Shed based WAP-7 electric locomotive from end to end.

Gallery

Coach composition

Other details 
The train's rake is split into three classes of travel, AC 1st class (code: H/1A), AC 2 Tier (code: A/2A) and AC 3 Tier (code:B/3A). Usually, the train has one H/1A coach, four A/2A coaches and four to eight B/3A coaches. The train also has one or two End-on-Generation cars at either end. This train is popular with passengers and made a daily train in 2009. Previously, it used to run 5 days a week. As a Rajdhani Express, it is a Superfast train and gets the highest priority on its journey between Ahmedabad and New Delhi.

See also 
Indian Railways

References

External links

 Swarna Jayanti Rajdhani Express India Rail Info

Transport in Ahmedabad
Transport in Delhi
Railway services introduced in 1998
Rail transport in Haryana
Rail transport in Rajasthan
Rail transport in Delhi
Rajdhani Express trains
Rail transport in Gujarat
Swarna Jayanti Express trains